Herbert Covington Bonner (May 16, 1891 – November 7, 1965) was a Democratic U.S. Congressman from North Carolina between 1940 and 1965.

Born in Washington, North Carolina, Bonner attended school in Warrenton. He served in the United States Army during World War I, and worked as a salesman, a farmer, and then as secretary to Congressman Lindsay Warren from 1924 to 1940.

Upon Warren's resignation from Congress in 1940, Bonner was elected simultaneously to complete the unexpired term, and was elected to the 77th Congress for a full term. He served for twelve full terms, from November 5, 1940 until his death from cancer in Washington, D.C. on November 7, 1965. During the 79th Congress, he chaired the Committee on Election of President, Vice President, and Representatives in Congress, and in the 84th through 89th Congresses, he chaired the Committee on Merchant Marine and Fisheries.

He was a signatory to the 1956 Southern Manifesto that opposed the desegregation of public schools ordered by the Supreme Court in Brown v. Board of Education.

Bonner died in office in 1965 in Washington, D.C.; he is buried in Washington, N.C.

Legacy

A former bridge spanning Oregon Inlet on the Outer Banks was named in honor of him and his service to the state of North Carolina.  When the bridge was replaced in 2019, 1,000 ft of the Bonner bridge was left to be used a pier and retains the Bonner name.

The M/V Herbert C. Bonner, a 25 car ferry was also named for him. The 112 ft. vessel was built in 1970 for the North Carolina Department of Transportation Ferry Division to cross Hatteras Inlet between Hatteras and Ocracoke Islands on the outer banks of North Carolina. The ferry was taken out of service and sold by NCDOT. The Bonner was purchased by A&R Marine and now operates on Narragansett Bay where it crosses between Bristol and Prudence Island.

Bonner was the namesake of the former Herbert C. Bonner Scout Reservation, commonly known as "Camp Bonner", located near Washington, NC. This is now known as the East Carolina Scout Reservation. The portion of the camp on the North side on the Pamlico River still bears the name Camp Bonner and is the regular site of the council camporee for the East Carolina Council of the Boy Scouts of America.

See also
 List of United States Congress members who died in office (1950–99)
 List of members of the House Un-American Activities Committee

References

External links

1891 births
1965 deaths
People from Washington, North Carolina
Democratic Party members of the United States House of Representatives from North Carolina
20th-century American politicians
Deaths from cancer in Washington, D.C.
American segregationists